Arthur Tovmasyan (born 2 December 1962) is the President of the National Assembly of the internationally unrecognized Republic of Artsakh since 21 May 2020.

References

Living people
Politicians from the Republic of Artsakh
1962 births
People from Stepanakert
Artsakh University alumni